Fransson is a Swedish surname.

Geographical distribution
As of 2014, 95.6% of all known bearers of the surname Fransson were residents of Sweden (frequency 1:686) and 1.3% of Norway (1:25,712).

In Sweden, the frequency of the surname was higher than national average (1:686) in the following counties:
 1. Kronoberg County (1:142)
 2. Jönköping County (1:201)
 3. Kalmar County (1:215)
 4. Blekinge County (1:355)
 5. Östergötland County (1:430)
 6. Örebro County (1:570)
 7. Västra Götaland County (1:607)
 8. Västerbotten County (1:613)

People
Alexander Fransson (born 1994), Swedish professional footballer
Jenny Fransson (born 1987), female freestyle wrestler from Sweden
Johan Fransson (born 1985), Swedish professional ice hockey defenceman
Jonas Fransson (born 1980), Swedish professional ice hockey Goaltender
Kim Fransson (born 1982), Swedish singer songwriter
Magdalena Fransson (born 1972), Swedish politician
Sonja Fransson (born 1949), Swedish politician

See also
Branson (disambiguation)
Frankston (disambiguation)

References

Swedish-language surnames